The Type 722 Wangerooge-class tugs are a series of ocean-going tugboats that are used for rescue and salvage operation by the German Navy. They are also used for towing targets and retrieving training torpedoes. Survival training for aircraft crews are also carried out with them.

List of ships

The ships are named after East Frisian Islands.

Gallery

References
 Seeschlepper WANGEROOGE-Klasse (in German) - Marine (official homepage of the German Navy)

Auxiliary ships of Germany
Tugboats of Germany
Auxiliary tugboat classes
Auxiliary ships of the German Navy